Valentina Alexandrovna Savchenkova is a former Russian football defender who played for Ryazan-VDV. She has won five Russian leagues with Lada Togliatti, Zvezda Perm and VDV Ryazan.

She is a member of the Russian national team.

Official international goals
 2007 World Cup qualification
 1 in Russia 6–0 Scotland
 1 in Scotland 0–4 Russia
 2009 European Championship qualification
 1 in Poland 1–4 Russia
 2011 World Cup qualification
 1 in Russia 3–0 Ireland
 1 in Israel 1–6 Russia
 1 in Kazakhstan 0–6 Russia

References

Russian women's footballers
1983 births
Living people
Sportspeople from Omsk
Russia women's international footballers
Ryazan-VDV players
Kubanochka Krasnodar players
FC Lada Togliatti (women) players
Nadezhda Noginsk players
Zvezda 2005 Perm players
Women's association football defenders
Russian Women's Football Championship players